Hilder Florentina Youngberg Smith (August 10, 1890 – January 11, 1977) was an aerial acrobat, parachutist, and pioneer aviator. She was one of California's first female pilots and the first woman to fly an airplane from LAX. Hilder was a member of a flying aerial team called The Flying Sylvesters.

Biography
Born to Swedish parents Andrew G. Youngberg (1853-1935) and Frida A. Flard (1853-1963) on August 10, 1890, as Hilder Florentina Youngberg.  She married James Floyd Smith on May 11, 1907.   Together they barnstormed thru southern California for five years with the Flying Sylvesters.  In the summer of 1912, Hilder and Frank Shaw helped Floyd built his own airplane,  Floyd added dual controls to fly with Hilder. They had two sons Sylvester Smith (1908-1919) and Prevost Vedrines Smith (1913–1991) aka Prevost Floyd Smith.  In 1919 at age 11, Sylvester was tragically killed by a car in Chicago.

Glenn L. Martin needed a female parachutist to jump into the opening ceremonies of the new Los Angeles Harbor.  Hilder had never jumped before but made a deal to jump twice if she could use Martin's airplanes with flight lessons from her husband. In April 1914 she made two parachute jumps using a static line chute.  On her second jump climbing from a Glenn Martin piloted airplane correcting for drift on a windy April 1914 day, Hilder, a non-swimmer, was startled by seeing the Los Angeles bay below.  Reaching for the cockpit rail, she slipped tumbling from the airplane twisting the parachute lines.  Quickly untangling the chute lines, Hilder inflated her chute just in time, landing on the beach.  Watching the near disaster, her spouse Floyd Smith vowed to redesign the Broadwick static line parachute to safely operate away from the airplane.  Hilder's inspiration spurred Floyd to develop and patient the first freefall or modern parachute.  

On June 10, 1914, with flight instruction from her spouse, Hilder Smith made her first solo flight in Martin's airplane. In 1916, with passenger Adele Mosteri, she became the first female pilot to fly out of Bennett's bean field, which became LAX.

Hilder Florentina Smith died on January 11, 1977, in La Mesa, San Diego, California. She is buried at the Portal of Folded Wings Shrine to Aviation in California.

See also
 Albert Leo Stevens
 James Floyd Smith
 Charles Broadwick
 Leslie Irvin
 Edward L. Hoffman
 Collier Trophy
 Gleb Kotelnikov

References

External links
 
Hilder Florentina Smith at BillionGraves

Burials at Valhalla Memorial Park Cemetery
Members of the Early Birds of Aviation
1890 births
1977 deaths
American women aviators
Parachuting
1914 in aviation
Aviation history of the United States
Aviation pioneers
People from Galesburg, Illinois
American skydivers
20th-century American women
20th-century American people